Lillo is a small farming town in Spain, 94 km south of the capital Madrid.

The town has a population of 1000.

One main feature of the town other than its agricultural aspects is the airport located on the edge of the surban area of the town.

The town centre consists of a church and central plaza with water fountain, with all surban areas emanating from this point.

The town hosts a vegetable and sweet market every Monday morning which is the major social focal point for the residents who preside there once a week.

References

Municipalities in the Province of Toledo